Liang Weifen (born 28 July 1962) is a Chinese former swimmer who competed in the 1984 Summer Olympics.

References

1962 births
Living people
Chinese female breaststroke swimmers
Olympic swimmers of China
Swimmers at the 1984 Summer Olympics
Asian Games medalists in swimming
Swimmers at the 1978 Asian Games
Swimmers at the 1982 Asian Games
Universiade medalists in swimming
Asian Games silver medalists for China
Asian Games bronze medalists for China
Medalists at the 1978 Asian Games
Medalists at the 1982 Asian Games
Universiade silver medalists for China
Medalists at the 1981 Summer Universiade
20th-century Chinese women
21st-century Chinese women